Jason Robertson may refer to:
Jason Robertson (activist) (1980–2003), American AIDS activist
Jason Robertson (ice hockey) (born 1999), American ice hockey player
Jason Robertson (rugby union) (born 1994), New Zealand rugby union player